Amit Mistry (12 January 1974 – 23 April 2021) was an Indian actor drama, film and television actor. He had appeared in a number of tele serials, drama as well as films. He is mostly known for his appearance in Tenali rama, A Gentleman and Saat Phero Ki Hera Pherie.

Biography 
Mistry was born in 1974. He acted in theatre, TV shows and films. He was well known in Gujarati theatre. He played a role in Shor in the City , Saat Phero Ki Hera Pherie, Tenali Rama , Maddam Sir and in the Amazon Prime web series Bandish Bandits.

He died on 23 April 2021, in Andheri, Mumbai, following cardiac arrest.

Filmography

TV shows

Web series

References

External links

Indian male stage actors
Indian male film actors
Male actors in Hindi television
1974 births
2021 deaths
21st-century Indian male actors
Place of birth missing
Male actors in Gujarati-language films
Male actors in Hindi cinema
Gujarati people